Yaqublu or Yagublu may refer to:
Gugark, Armenia
Yaqublu, Gadabay, Azerbaijan
Yaqublu, Oghuz, Azerbaijan